Jiří Mužík (born 1 September 1976 in Plzeň) is a Czech hurdler.

His personal best time was 48.27 seconds, achieved during the heats of the 1997 World Championships in Athens.

Achievements

References

1976 births
Living people
Czech male hurdlers
Athletes (track and field) at the 2000 Summer Olympics
Athletes (track and field) at the 2004 Summer Olympics
Olympic athletes of the Czech Republic
European Athletics Championships medalists
Sportspeople from Plzeň